Shila-bhattarika (IAST: Śīlābhaṭṭārikā) was a 9th-century Sanskrit poet from present-day India. Her verses appear in most major Sanskrit anthologies, and her poetic skills have been praised by the medieval Sanskrit literary critics.

Biography 

Shilabhattarika lived in the 9th century. One of her poems mentions the Narmada River (Reva) and the Vindhya mountains. Therefore, as a young woman, she probably lived along the Narmada River, near the Vindhyas. M. B. Padma, a scholar of the University of Mysore, speculates that she may be same as Shila-mahadevi, the queen of the 8th century Rashtrakuta ruler Dhruva. Padma's theory is based on the facts that the suffix "Bhattarika" attached to the poet's name indicates her high social status, and that the queen is known to have made generous grants to scholars.

The 10th century poet Rajashekhara praises Shilabhattarika as a leading figure of the Panchali literary style (one of the four major contemporary literary styles - the other three being Vaidharbhi, Gaudi, and Lati). A verse, attributed to Rajashekhara in Vallabhadeva's  15th century anthology Subhashitavali, states that this style maintains "a balance between words and meaning". According to Rajashekhara, the Panchali style can be traced to the works of Shilabhattarika, and possibly in some of the works of the 7th century poet Bana.

Shilabhattarika has been quoted by several classical Sanskrit literary critics, and her verses appear in most major Sanskrit anthologies. She is known to have written at least 46 poems on topics such as "love, morality, politics, nature, beauty, the seasons, insects, anger, indignation, codes of conduct, and the characteristic features of various kinds of heroines." However, most of her works are now lost, and only six of her short poems are extant.

Sharngadhara-paddhati, a 14th-century anthology, praises her and three other female poets in the following words:

Example verses 

The following short poem of Shilabhattarika is considered as one of the greatest poems ever written in the Sanskrit tradition. Indian scholar Supriya Banik Pal believes that the poem expresses the speaker's anxiety to be reunited with her husband. According to American author Jeffrey Moussaieff Masson, the poetess, possibly a middle-aged woman, implies that the illicit, pre-marital love between her and her lover was richer than their love as a married couple. An interpretation by the 16-century philosopher Chaitanya suggests that the verse is a metaphor for a person's desire to be united with the "Supreme Lord - the Absolute".

The following verse expresses the speaker's longing for his wife:

In the following verse, a poor speaker expresses grief at not being able to provide his loved one with jewels or food:

The following verse, also quoted in the Subhashita Ratna Bhandagara, describes the importance of learning and engaging in discussions with scholars:

References

Bibliography 

 
 
 
 
 
 
 
 

Sanskrit-language women poets
Sanskrit poets
Indian women poets
9th-century Indian poets